The Multicultural Progress Party is a defunct minor political party in South Australia led by Lam Duc Vu and Trish Nguyen from IFIG Australia (Melbourne). The party contested the 2014 state election in the upper house with a 0.2 percent vote.

See also
List of political parties in Australia
Unity Party (Australia)

References

External links
Multicultural Progress Party website

Political parties in South Australia